Natasha is a Canadian drama film, which premiered in 2015 before being released in Canada in 2016 and in the United States in 2017.  The film was written and directed by David Bezmozgis, based on the title story from his 2004 short story collection Natasha and Other Stories.

Plot
Mark Berman, an idealistic Jewish Canadian teenager in Toronto is seduced into a torrid affair by the mysteriously appearing but extremely ruthless Natasha, the daughter of his uncle Fima's new Russian mail-order bride who has been living a double life as a sex worker since childhood. Although the original short story took place in the 1980s, for the film Bezmozgis updated the temporal setting to the present day in order to explore the impact of contemporary technology, such as the internet, on the story.

Cast
Alex Ozerov as Mark Berman
Sasha K. Gordon as Natasha
Lola Tash as Jana
Aidan Shipley as Rufus
Deanna Dezmari as Bella
Pavel Tsitrinel as Meyer
Mila Kanev as Dora
Alla Kadysh as Faina
Igor Ovadis as Faina's uncle
Sergiy Kotelenets as Gena
John Mavro as Daniel
Jonathan Purdon as older pool guy
Grisha Pasternak as Vadim
Joshua Teixeira as kid 1
Kylon Howell as kid 2

Release
The film premiered at the Boston Jewish Film Festival in November 2015, and was screened at several other film festivals before going into general commercial release in Canada in May 2016.

Awards
The film garnered two Canadian Screen Award nominations at the 5th Canadian Screen Awards in 2017, for Best Actress (Gordon) and Best Adapted Screenplay (Bezmozgis).

Reception
Natasha scored an "Extremely Fresh" rating of 100% based on 11 critical reviews on Rotten Tomatoes, with an average rating of 7.21/10. Based on 6 critics on Metacritic, Natasha has a rank of 76 out of a 100, indicating "generally favorable reviews".

Neil Genzlinger of The New York Times wrote "[the film] creates a disturbing portrait of a girl turned calculating and nihilistic by her upbringing, and there is no coyness here".

Peter Howell of Toronto Star had praised the film, saying that "[it] succeeds because of its haunting lead performances".

Varietys Jessica Kiang wrote "David Bezmozgis adapts his own short story into an impressively controlled coming of age tale animated by a cunning central performance".

According to Tatiana Craine of The Village Voice, "Natasha is as beguiling and confounding as its title character".

Tomris Laffly of RogerEbert.com said that "[the director] manages to summon something richer out of this tale you might temporarily feel you've been told before".

References

External links

2015 drama films
2015 films
Canadian drama films
English-language Canadian films
Jewish Canadian films
2010s Canadian films